WCSD may refer to:
 Watson Chapel School District, Jefferson County, Arkansas
 Washoe County School District, Nevada
 Waterloo Community School District, Waterloo, Iowa
 Waukee Community School District, Waukee, Iowa
 Wayne County School District (disambiguation) (multiple)
 Whittier City School District, California
 Watertown City School District, New York
 Williamsville Central School District, New York
 Wappingers Central School District, New York
 WCSD-LP, a low-power radio station (104.9 FM) licensed to Shawnee-on-Delaware, Pennsylvania, United States